This is a list of United Nations Security Council Resolutions 101 to 200 adopted between 24 November 1953 and 15 March 1965.

See also 
 Lists of United Nations Security Council resolutions
 List of United Nations Security Council Resolutions 1 to 100
 List of United Nations Security Council Resolutions 201 to 300

0101